Kelvin Clarke (born 26 December 1947) is a former Australian rules footballer who played with Melbourne in the Victorian Football League (VFL).

Notes

External links 		

		
		
		
		
1947 births
Living people
Australian rules footballers from Victoria (Australia)		
Melbourne Football Club players